Podolí is a district in Prague located south of the city centre, on the right (east) riverbank. It borders Vyšehrad in the north, Pankrác (a part of Nusle and Krč districts) in the east and Braník in the south. The river Vltava separates Podolí from Smíchov and Hlubočepy on the other riverbank.

Notable buildings of the district include neoclassical Podolí Waterworks completed in 20th century, Church of St. Michael the Archangel which is one of the oldest churches in the whole city or Podolí Swimming Stadium.

Districts of Prague
Prague 4